Štadión FC ViOn is a football stadium in the city of Zlaté Moravce in Slovakia. It is the home ground of FC ViOn Zlaté Moravce and has a capacity of 4,006. The intensity of the floodlighting is 1,400 lux.

History

The stadium was built in 1998 and used for football matches of FC ViOn Zlaté Moravce sport club. The original capacity was 3,300 spectators. Due to renovation work in 2014 the capacity was increased to 4,000.

Photo gallery

International matches
FC ViOn stadium has hosted one friendly match of the Slovakia national football team.

External links
Stadium Database Article
Football stadiums profile

References

Football venues in Slovakia
Buildings and structures in Nitra Region
Sport in Nitra Region
Sports venues completed in 1998